Inoka Galagedara (born 17 July 1977) is a Sri Lankan cricketer.

References

1977 births
Living people
Sri Lankan women cricketers
Sri Lanka women One Day International cricketers
Sri Lanka women Twenty20 International cricketers
Cricketers from Colombo